Safinatu Buhari (née Yusuf) (11 December 1952 – 14 January 2006) was a Nigerian teacher and First Lady of Nigeria from 1983 to 1985. She was the first wife of Muhammadu Buhari.

Early life and education 
Safinatu Yusuf was born on 11 December 1952 to Alhaji Yusufu Mani and Hajia Hadizatu Mani in Jos, Plateau State. She was of the Fulani tribe of Northern Nigeria and hailed from Mani Local Government in Katsina State. She attended Tudun Wada primary school. Her family relocated to Lagos State when the then commissioner for Lagos affairs, Musa Yar'Adua appointed her father as his private secretary.

She enrolled at the Women Teacher's Training College in Katsina and received a Grade 2 Teachers Certificate in 1971. She was versed in Islamic education and was lettered in both English and Arabic.

Personal life 
She met Muhammadu Buhari at the age of 14 and they married in 1971 when she was 18. They had 5 children namely; Zulaihatu (deceased), Magajiya-Fatima, Hadizatu-Nana, Safinatu Lami and Musa (deceased). When Muhammadu Buhari's government was overthrown by Ibrahim Babangida, she relocated to Kaduna with her children. Following the military coup that Muhammadu depoari as president on August 27,1985, he was released from prison. He divorced Safinatu shortly after his release; the reason for Buhari's divorce from his first wife has remained unknown. However, it is rumored that Safinatu was accused of receiving financial assistance from Babangida while her husband was imprisoned despite her husband's warning.  

Buhari, was diagnosed with diabetes in 1998. 

Her style was both traditional and minimal. It portrayed her ethnic origin. 

They divorced in 1988.

First Lady of Nigeria 
Buhari was the seventh First Lady of Nigeria from 31 December 1983 to 27 August 1985. She was largely unknown by Nigerians as she did not have her own office or personal staff in Dodan Barracks. She stayed out of the public eye but took up responsibility hosting visiting First Ladies.

Death 
Buhari died 14 January 2006 as a result of diabetes-related complications at the age of 53.

References

Nigerian educators
2006 deaths
1952 births
First Ladies of Nigeria
Deaths from diabetes